Thermopsis montana, the false lupin, mountain goldenbanner, golden pea, mountain thermopsis, or revonpapu, is a plant species which is native to the western United States. The Latin specific epithet montana refers to mountains or coming from mountains.

Description
Thermopsis montana is a perennial herb. Flowers bloom May to August. The leaves grow in triplicate formations.

The plant grows densely in meadows and in moist areas of the high plains, sometimes in association with sagebrush.

Cultivation
It is used as a medicinal plant, and as an ornamental plant in gardens. It is suspected of being poisonous. It is avoided by livestock.

References

Further reading

External links
Oregonstate.edu: Thermopsis montana

Sophoreae
Flora of the Western United States
Flora of the Rocky Mountains
Flora of Arizona
Flora of Idaho
Flora of Montana
Flora of New Mexico
Flora of Nevada
Flora of Oregon
Flora of Utah
Flora of Wyoming
Medicinal plants of North America
Garden plants of North America
Flora without expected TNC conservation status